Poecilia velifera, known as the Yucatan molly and also as the giant sailfin molly amongst aquarists, is a very large Livebearer that lives in coastal waters of the Yucatan peninsula. These live-bearer (Poeciliidae) fish are particularly well known for both the extreme size variation among males, and the sexual dimorphism between males and females in both body shape and behavior.

It is outwardly similar to the sailfin molly, P. latipinna, though larger overall and with a higher and longer dorsal fin in males. Full-grown fish are usually larger than 10 cm (4 in) and large females can reach almost twice this length, though especially captive-bred individuals grow only to the size of sailfin mollies. The dorsal fins are the most distinctive character for telling the species apart: Those of the Yucatan molly have nearly 20 fin rays, counting where the fin meets the back, whereas the sailfin molly has less than 15 (intermediate numbers may indicate hybrids).

If the males spread their dorsal fins in display, these have a distinct fan or trapezoid shape, with the upper edge being distinctly longer than the lower. The height of the dorsal fin, measured at the posterior edge, is a bit larger than the height of the tail.

Common names
Some names of the Yucatan molly - such as Segelkärpfling or the specific name velifera - contain an element signifying "sail", aggravating the confusion with the sailfin molly. The French terms are used for both species indiscriminately, as is the Japanese name (which is simply the Japanized form of "sailfin molly").

Dutch: Hoogvinkarper
English: Yucatan molly, sailfin molly (though this name is often used for Poecilia latipinna as well as the commercially produced hybrids kept by fishkeepers)
French: Molliénésie á voilure or simply "molly voile"
German: Segelkärpfling
Japanese: セイルフィン モーリー (seirufuin mōrī)
Polish: Molinezja żaglopłetwa
Portuguese: Molinésia velífera
Russian: Моллинезия Велифера, Широкоплавничная моллинезия
Dansk: Sejlfinnemolly
Thai: plā sel fi nyạks̄ʹ̒ (ปลาเซลฟินยักษ์; literally: "giant sailfin")
"Korean": 자이언트 세일핀 몰리 ("Giant sailfim molly)
Indonesian : Cere Laut

In the aquarium
Especially small strains are suitable for keeping in an aquarium. However, this fish is not as easy to keep as the sailfin molly, let alone the P. sphenops (black molly). They need spacious tanks with well-aerated, slightly brackish
water to thrive. They are able to withstand higher temperatures than most pet fish. Although they can survive over 30 °C for prolonged periods of time if other conditions are good, temperatures should be kept between 25 and 30 °C. Direct sunlight and an ample supply of plant food, such as lettuce, peas, or certain algae, are necessary for optimal health; in subtropical areas, they can be kept outside in unheated tanks in the summer; in temperate zones, backup heating may be necessary.They are euryhaline species. This strain of molly can also be kept in saltwater reef tanks, and provide clean-up duties for the tank. To transition a molly to saltwater, adjustment time is needed; increase the salt content to match the reef tank over a period of three hours.

They are bred like other mollies; in line with their general requirements, this is somewhat more difficult than in related species. It is especially hard to get males to grow their spectacular fins. Professional breeders often separate males and females in winter, so that they are eager to breed in spring. Young can then, climate permitting, grow in spacious outdoor basins during summer.

Like other Poecilia, they are prone to hybridization with their relatives. Not infrequently, crosses are attempted with the sailfin molly to breed a hardier fish. This is generally not very successful, and should not be attempted, as purebred Yucatan mollies are often quite hard to find, and hybrids will not have as massive dorsal fins as these. Several color variants are also available; these usually do not attain the large size of wild-type fish and may have been crossbred with P. latipinna.

Reminder

External links

velifera
Fish described in 1914
Freshwater fish of Mexico
Live-bearing fish
Ovoviviparous fish
Taxa named by Charles Tate Regan